Hinstock is a village and civil parish in Shropshire, England.

It appeared in the Domesday book survey as "Stoche" (from Old English stoc, "dependent settlement"); the present version of its name was created in the mediaeval period by prefixing Middle English hine ("domestic servants").

Hinstock is approximately halfway between the market towns of Newport and Market Drayton. The A41 road, which until the 1980s ran through its centre, now bypasses the village. Hinstock is at the junction of the A529 road joining to Nantwich to the A41. A Roman road still exists in part as a road and as a footpath through Hinstock. The settlement of High Heath is to the north of the village alongside the A41 and to the west of Hinstock (at ) and forming part of the civil parish is the hamlet of Pixley.

Hinstock's facilities include a primary school; a village shop and post office; St Oswald's Church of England parish church; a pub named the Falcon Inn; a village hall; a Methodist chapel; two tennis courts; a football pitch; a five a side court; a cricket pitch; a small snooker hall and a running club.

Victorian hymn-writer and hymnologist John Ellerton was parish Rector of Hinstock from 1872 to 1876.

The village hall was built as a memorial after World War I, as was a wheel cross monument which stands at a junction in the village.

Near the village is a very small nature reserve, Quarry Wood, which is managed by the Shropshire Wildlife Trust.

From 1941 to 1947 there was a co-located Royal Air Force and Royal Navy Fleet Air Arm training station called RNAS Hinstock (HMS Godwit), which specialised in instrument and blind landing technologies. A Royal Navy officer and seaman from the base are buried in Hinstock Church's burial ground.

In 1983, David Williams, spotted the recently completed Pixley Lane Bridge over the new and not yet opened Hinstock bypass. Living locally he walked down and measured up and reckoned his Saab 91D Safir (Sapphire), a single-engined, light aircraft built in Holland would fit under the bridge. His dad stood on the bridge with a camera to capture his stunt on the day before it opened to traffic. His Dad was too quick with the shutter but a friend did get an ’80’s quality pic, to prove it happened.

See also
Listed buildings in Hinstock

References

External links

 Hinstock Parish Council

Villages in Shropshire
Civil parishes in Shropshire